The 2015 MCLA Tournament is the 19th annual single-elimination tournament to determine the national championship for Men's Collegiate Lacrosse Association (MCLA).  The tournament is being held in Irvine, CA for the second year in a row, hosted by Chapman University. 16 Division 1 teams and 16 Division 2 teams will be selected to compete in two different brackets of the tournament based upon their performance during the regular season, and for some, by means of a conference tournament automatic qualifier.

Division 1 Bracket

 * = Overtime

Division 1 Tournament Appearances

Results

This marks the first National Championship for Grand Canyon University in only their 4th year in the MCLA Division 1. Previously to competing in the MCLA, GCU was an NCAA II program.

Division 2 Bracket

 * = Overtime

References

MCLA Tournament
College lacrosse competitions in the United States
MCLA Tournament